Cheslyn Peter Montague Jones (4 July 1918–13 October 1987) was an Anglican priest and liturgical scholar.

Biography 
Jones was ordained priest in 1942 after studying at Magdalen College, Oxford. After curacies in Wallsend (1941–1943) and Northolt Park (1943–1946), he lived at Nashdom Abbey (1946–1951). He then served as Chaplain of Wells Theological College (1951–1952).

In Oxford, from 1952 to 1956, he served as Priest-Librarian at Pusey House and Chaplain at Christ Church, before moving to Chichester where he was Canon, Chancellor and Librarian of Chichester Cathedral, and Principal of Chichester Theological College. In 1971, he returned to Pusey House to take up the role of Principal. From 1981 he returned to parish work in the Diocese of Peterborough.

He delivered the 1970 Bampton Lectures on Christ and Christianity: a study in origins in the light of St Paul.

He was also a member of the 20th Century Church Light Music Group.

Works

References 

1918 births
1987 deaths
Church of England priests
Alumni of Magdalen College, Oxford